is a Japanese NHK employee and former television announcer, and a graduate of the University of Tokyo's arts department. In June 1998, she appeared on "Live from Studio Park", NHK's live talk show.

Sayumi Michishige, former member of J-pop idol group Morning Musume, was named after Horie by her father.

References

1963 births
Japanese announcers
Japanese television personalities
Living people
People from Yokohama